Macieira may refer to:

Macieira de Rates, village in Portugal
Macieira, Santa Catarina, municipality in Brazil
Macieira Brandy, Portuguese spirit